Držov is a village in Písek District, Czech Republic. It is a part of Vojníkov municipality, being situated between Vojníkov and Louka.

Villages in Písek District